Johan Marius Nicolaas Heesters (5 December 1903 – 24 December 2011), known professionally as Johannes Heesters, was a Dutch actor of stage, television and film, as well as a vocalist of numerous recordings and performer on the concert stage with a career dating back to the 1920s. He worked as an actor until his death and was one of the oldest performing entertainers in history, performing shortly before his death at the age of 108. Heesters was almost exclusively active in the German-speaking world from the mid-1930s and became a film star in Nazi Germany, which later led to controversy in his native country. He was able to maintain his popularity in Germany in the decades until his death.

Early life

Heesters was born in Amersfoort, Netherlands, the youngest of four sons. His father Jacobus Heesters (1865–1946) was a salesman and his mother Geertruida Jacoba van den Heuvel (1866–1951), a homemaker.

Heesters was fluent in German from an early age, having lived for several years in the household of a German great uncle from Bavaria. Heesters decided to become an actor and a singer at the age of 16 and began vocal training. He specialized in Viennese operetta very early in his career, and made his Viennese stage debut in 1934 in Carl Millöcker's Der Bettelstudent (The Beggar Student).

Nazi Germany
Aged 31, Heesters permanently moved to Germany with his wife and daughters in 1935. His signature role was Count Danilo Danilovich in Franz Lehár's  (The Merry Widow). His version of Count Danilo's entrance song, "", was well known. During his time in Germany, he performed for Adolf Hitler and visited the Dachau concentration camp, which made him a controversial figure for many Dutch. Joseph Goebbels placed Heesters on the Gottbegnadeten list as an artist considered crucial to Nazi culture; he was the only non-German included.

Heesters funded the German war machine by donating money to the weapons industry. This helped to make him a very controversial figure in the late 1970s. Heesters always denied these accusations despite reliable evidence.

He befriended several high-ranking Nazi-officials and SS-officers. Hitler is known to have been an avid admirer of his acting skills.

At the same time, Heesters was idolized by the Swingboy subculture, who admired his pale face and combed long black hair and tried to copy his attire. His style contrasted that promoted by the Hitlerjugend.

Heesters met Hitler several times, especially in the role of Count Danilo. Throughout the war, Heesters continued to perform for German soldiers in camps and barracks. According to German author Volker Kühn, Heesters performed for the SS at the Dachau concentration camp. Kühn cites as evidence the testimony of a Dachau inmate, Viktor Matejka, who worked for the SS and told Kühn he pulled the curtain when Heesters performed in 1941. According to German writer Jürgen Trimborn however, the interview with Matejka may not be reliable as it occurred some 50 years after the performance was said to have taken place.

In December 2009, Heesters lost his libel suit against Kühn. While acknowledging having visited the camp, he denied having performed as entertainment for the SS troops. In its ruling, the German court did not find whether Kühn's allegations were true, but rather that too much time had passed for an accurate determination of fact to be made.

After the war

Heesters worked extensively for UFA until almost the end of the Second World War (his last wartime movie being Die Fledermaus, produced in 1945) and easily made the transition from the Nazi-controlled cultural scene to post-war Germany and Austria, appearing again in a number of films. He stopped making movies around 1960 to concentrate on stage and television appearances and on producing records.

In later years, Heesters spoke fondly of Hitler as a person, but condemned his political stance. In the 1990s, he and his wife toured Germany and Austria with Curth Flatow's play  (A Blessed Age), which was also televised in 1996. On 5 December 2003, he celebrated his 100th birthday with a television special  (A legend turns 100) on the ARD television channel. He received the title "". In December 2004, at the age of 101, Heesters appeared in Stuttgart at the  theatre in a show commissioned on the occasion of his 100th birthday, . In 2005, at the age of 102, he was featured as a soloist in a major concert tour with the  under the direction of Scott Lawton. On 5 December 2007, he celebrated his 104th birthday with a concert at the Admiralspalast, Berlin. Then in February 2008, he performed in his home country for the first time in four decades amidst protests against his Nazi associations.

On 13 December 2008, at the age of 105, Heesters apologised for calling Adolf Hitler a "good chap" on the popular German TV show . He stated that he had said something stupid and horrible and asked for forgiveness. German media suggested that he had failed to understand the show's satirical nature.

Heesters played smaller roles in his last years, as he began to lose his eyesight due to macular degeneration and could not perform on stage for long periods of times. Unable to read a teleprompter, he had to memorize his lines before a show. He played in the 2011 short film Ten as Simon Petrus and made his last stage appearance on 31 October 2011 in Munich.

Personal life

Heesters had two daughters by his first wife Louisa Ghijs, whom he married in 1930. After her death in 1985, he remarried in 1992. His second wife, Simone Rethel (born 1949), was a German actress, painter, and photographer. His younger daughter Nicole Heesters is a well-known actress in the German-speaking world, as is his granddaughter Saskia Fischer.

On 1 January 2008, he fell down some stairs in his holiday home in Tyrol and broke two ribs.

In December 2010, 107-year-old Heesters announced that he had quit smoking for his then 61-year-old wife: "She should have me as long as possible."

On 31 October 2011, Heesters gave his last public performance at the Bayrischer Hof in Munich. Four weeks later, on 29 November 2011, he developed a fever, and was rushed into the hospital. He was fitted with a heart pacemaker and following a good recovery was allowed to go home less than a week later on 04th December 2011 just in time to spend his 108th birthday the next day with family. He did not feel strong enough to make the planned stage appearance to sing in celebration of his birthday and also had missed the premiere of his last film, Ten. Due to a relapse in his condition, on 17 December he was readmitted to the hospital where he subsequently suffered a stroke, dying on Christmas Eve in 2011. He was survived by two daughters, five grandchildren, eleven great-grandchildren and three great-great-grandchildren.

Discography

Albums
1965: 
2003: 

Singles
1937: ""
1939: "" (featuring Marika Rökk)
1941: ""
1941: ""
1949: ""
1949: ""
1998: ""
2007: "" (featuring Claus Eisenmann)

Honours, decorations, awards
1984: Bavarian Order of Merit
1993: Berlinian Order of Merit
2000: Ring of Honour of the City of Vienna
Bambi in 1967, 1987, 1990, 1997, 2003, 2007, 2008, 2009, 2010, 2011
2001: Platinum Romy (TV award)
2003: 
2004:

Filmography

1924: Cirque hollandais
1934: Bleeke Bet - Ko Monje
1935: De Vier Mullers - Otto Muller, hun zoon
1935: Everything for the Company
1936: The Emperor's Candlesticks - Grossfürst Peter Alexandrowitsch
1936: The Beggar Student - Simon Rymanowics
1936: The Court Concert - Lt. Walter van Arnegg
1936: Die Weltmeisterin
1937: When Women Keep Silent - Curt van Doeren
1937: Gasparone - Erminio Bondo
1938: Nanon - Marquis Charles d'Aubigne
1938: Immer wenn ich glücklich bin
1939:  - Heinz van Zeelen
1939: Hello Janine! - Count Rene
1939: My Aunt, Your Aunt - Peter Larisch
1940:  - Enrico Villanova, Tenor
1940: Die lustigen Vagabunden - Werner Schratt, Schauspieler
1940: Roses in Tyrol - Graf Herbert von Waldendorf
1941:  - Will Hollers
1941:  - Peter Holm
1941:  - Stefan von Holtenau
1943:  - Tenor Peter Hansen
1943: Melody of a Great City - Spielt sich selbst in einer Revue (cameo)
1944:  - Manfred
1944: Glück bei Frauen - Stefan Hell
1944: Es fing so harmlos an - Clemens Verné
1944: Axel an der Himmelstür - Axel
1946: Die Fledermaus - Herbert Eisenstein
1946: Renee XIV - (unfinished film)
1947: Wiener Melodien - Ferry van der Heuvels
1948: Insolent and in Love - Dr. Peter Schild, Ingenieur
1949: Dear Friend - Adrian van der Steer
1950: When a Woman Loves - Martin Pratt
1950: Wedding Night In Paradise - Pieter van Goos
1951: Professor Nachtfalter - Professor Dr. Joachim Wendler
1951: Tanz ins Glück - Pedro Domingo
1951: The Csardas Princess - Edwin von Weylersheim
1952: The White Horse Inn - Dr. Siedler
1953: The Moon Is Blue - Tourist (uncredited)
1953: Die Jungfrau auf dem Dach - David Slader
1953: A Musical War of Love - Ralph Beyron
1953: The Divorcée - Karel
1953: Hit Parade - Singer
1953:  - Franz von Suppé
1955: Hello, My Name is Cox - Paul Cox
1955: The Star of Rio - Don Felipe
1955: Bel Ami - Georges Duroy genannt Bel Ami
1956: Ein Herz und eine Seele / …und wer küßt mich - Johannes Heesters
1956:  Opera Ball - Georg Dannhauser
1956: My Husband's Getting Married Today - Robert Petersen
1957: Victor and Victoria - Jean Perrot
1957: Von allen geliebt - Rudolf Avenarius
1958:  - Michael Norman
1958:  - Bernhard Hauff
1958:  - John Underhower
1959: Die unvollkommene Ehe - Professor Paul Lert
1961:  - Charles Fürst
1985: Otto – Der Film - Clochard
1994: Silent Love (Short) - Geigensolist
2008: 1½ Knights – In Search of the Ravishing Princess Herzelinde - Wissenschaftler
2011: Ten (short) - Mr. Peterson (final film role)

Television
1956: Meine Schwester und ich (TV film) - Dr. Roger Fleuriot
1960: Am grünen Strand der Spree (TV miniseries) - Graf Chiaroscuro
1968: Unsere liebste Freundin (TV film) - Christian Bach-Nielsen
1973:  (TV film) - Prince Felice Baciocchi
1973: Hallo – Hotel Sacher … Portier!: Opernball (TV series episode) - Marinus de Ryder
1974: Hochzeitsnacht im Paradies (TV film) - Dr. Hansen
1980: Liebe bleibt nicht ohne Schmerzen (TV film) - Narrator
1982: Sonny Boys (TV film) - Al Lewis
1984: Beautiful Wilhelmine (TV miniseries) - Marschall Keith
1991: Altes Herz wird nochmal jung (TV film)
1991-1993: Zwei Münchner in Hamburg (TV series, 33 episodes) - Konsul Thaddäus van Daalen
1995: Zwei alte Hasen: Grandhotel (TV series episode) - Jan van Houten
1996: Ein gesegnetes Alter (TV film)
1999: Theater: Momo (TV film) - Meister Hora
2001: Otto – Mein Ostfriesland und mehr
2003: In aller Freundschaft: Zurück ins Leben (TV series episode) - Prof. Dr. Junghans
2008: Wege zum Glück (TV series episode) - Arbeitgeber Johannes Heesters

References

External links

Postcards and tobacco cards

1903 births
2011 deaths
Dutch collaborators with Nazi Germany
Dutch centenarians
Dutch male film actors
20th-century Dutch male singers
Dutch expatriates in Germany
Dutch male musical theatre actors
Dutch male silent film actors
Dutch male stage actors
Dutch male television actors
Dutch tenors
German-language singers
People from Amersfoort
People of Nazi Germany
Recipients of the Order of Merit of Berlin
Controversies in Germany
Controversies in the Netherlands
Film controversies in Germany
Film controversies in the Netherlands
Theatre controversies
Men centenarians